Jean-Pierre Brard, (born 7 February 1948), is a French politician.  Initially a teacher, he entered politics and was elected was deputy mayor of Montreuil, Seine-Saint-Denis, a post he held until 1984 when he was elected mayor of the same city. He remained mayor until March  2008.  He is a member of the Convention for a Progressive Alternative (CAP) and a deputy to the French National Assembly since 1988.   A former member of the French Communist Party (until 1996), he is affiliated to the parliamentary group of the Democratic and Republican Left.  He is a member of the Parliamentary Office for evaluation of scientific and technological options, and he participates in various task forces and commissions on sects, the economy and finance.

Political offices held

Local offices

1971–1984 City Council and Deputy Mayor of Montreuil

1984–2008 Mayor of Montreuil

2008–2014 Municipal Councilor of Montreuil (opposition)

Member of Parliament

1988–2012 member of the seventh district of Seine-Saint-Denis

References

External links
  Official site

1948 births
Living people
People from Orne
French Communist Party politicians
Convention for a Progressive Alternative politicians
Mayors of places in Île-de-France
Deputies of the 13th National Assembly of the French Fifth Republic